Gumby: The Movie (also referred to as its on-screen title Gumby 1) is a 1995 American stop-motion surrealist claymation adventure film featuring the character Gumby.

The film was released on October 4, 1995, and was mostly panned by critics; it went on to become a box-office flop, earning only $57,100 against its $2.8 million budget at the US box office, although much of its financial failure can be attributed to its very limited theatrical rollout. The film did, however, achieve a cult status among its fan base—especially on home media, where it quickly sold around a million copies on VHS—to the point where it received a 2007 remastered showing at the Tribeca Film Festival.

Plot
When the Blockheads' E-Z Loan company threatens to take away the farms belonging to the small farmers due to being unable to make their loan payments, Gumby and his band, the Clayboys, decide to have a benefit concert to save the farms. But when the evil Blockheads find out that Gumby's dog, Lowbelly, cries pearls when he sees the Clayboys perform, they decide to kidnap Lowbelly and force him to cry pearls (initially unaware that Lowbelly was only crying whenever Gumby changed his shape). Lowbelly doesn't respond to the Blockheads' initial attempt, but the Blockheads subsequently are informed by computer analysis that they need Gumby to extract the pearls, so they kidnap Gumby and the Clayboys in order to create robotic clones of them.

With the help of Pokey, Prickle, Goo, fans Tara and Ginger, and talent agent Lucky Claybert, Gumby takes on his robot clone and is still in time for his videotaping session in agreement with Claybert. At a picnic, Gumby announces that he's opening his own farm-centered loan company that will give reasonable loans for its customers. The Blockheads are forced to weed Gumby's garden as punishment, and Gumby and best friend Pokey decide that things are looking up for them as they head back to outer space.

Cast
 Dallas McKennon (as Charles Farrington) voices Gumby: a young green boy made of clay
 McKennon also voices Professor Kapp: an exuberant scientist with a voice like Ed Wynn; Fatbuckle: a red man with a big belt (his name is a play on "Fatty" Arbuckle); Lucky Claybert: a Groucho-like talent agent who makes a music video called "Gumbymania" (although it's officially known as "Take Me Away" in the credits); and Nobuckle: a yellow man with a New Jersey accent
 Art Clokey voices Pokey: a talking red horse and Gumby's best friend
 Clokey also voices Prickle: a yellow dinosaur with a Mel Blanc–like voice and Gumbo: Gumby's dad
 Gloria Clokey voices Goo: a blue flying teenage mermaid
 Manny La Carruba voices Thinbuckle: a blue teenager with a thin belt. A teenager much like Gumby and Goo.
 Patti Morse (speaking voice)/Melisa Kary (singing voice) voices Tara: a light blue female and Gumby's love interest
 Alice Young voices Ginger: Tara's best friend
 Janet MacDuff voices Gumba: Gumby's mom
 Bonnie Rudolph voices Lowbelly: the dog who cries pearls every time he sees Gumby change shapes
 Rudolph also voices Farm Lady
 Ozzie Ahlers voices Radio Announcer
 Kirby Coleman voices the "This Way 'N That" singer
 Anthony McNulty voices "Burnzy"
 David Archer
 Lillian Nicol
 Rick Warren
 Stan Freberg (uncredited)

Production
Production on Gumby: The Movie was completed in 1992. Despite this, Premavision was unable to find a distributor for the film until 1995, when they found a small company called Arrow Releasing (not to be confused with Arrow Films). John R. Dilworth, who would later be known for creating Cartoon Network's Courage the Cowardly Dog, served as the film's animation consultant.

The musical score was composed by Jerry Gerber, who previously worked on the television series, and Marco D'Ambrosio. Additionally, Ozzie Ahlers wrote and produced the featured songs "Take Me Away", "Ark Park" and "This Way'n That". Ahlers was also responsible for hiring frequent collaborator and Starship guitarist Craig Chaquico to play the electric guitar parts.

Release

Box office 
Gumby: The Movie was released on October 4, 1995, by Arrow Releasing, but received only a limited release in 21 theaters. The film grossed $57,100 at the box office.

Critical reception 
On review aggregator Rotten Tomatoes the film has an approval rating of 20% based on reviews from 5 critics.

David Kronke of The Los Angeles Times described the screenplay as "tired and listless", and criticized the dialogue as unsophisticated and hastily assembled.

Common Sense Media rated the movie a two out of five stars, stating, "The animation in this feature film edition might feel old-fashioned and clumsy; the story bland and simplistic. It's slow going, not terribly funny, and it's repetitive. Still it has a quirky charm that kids respond to, especially the grown-up "kids" who are long-time fans and enjoy the memories that repeat viewings provide."

Several critics focused on the animation, particularly how it incorporated less advanced technology than films like Toy Story (1995), Pocahontas (1995), and stop-motion features like The Nightmare Before Christmas (1993).

Home media
The film was released on home video on VHS by KidVision and Astral Home Video on December 26, 1995; it would be the former company's final release before becoming defunct. The next year, Warner Home Video released the film on VHS, which became a top-10 seller, selling about a million copies overall on this format in total. It was released on DVD by Classic Media on April 22, 2008. NCircle Entertainment released the film on Blu-ray September 5, 2017.

RiffTrax released their own commentary of the film on May 28, 2021.

References

External links
 
 
Gumby: The Movie at the TCM Movie Database
 Excerpt

1995 films
1995 animated films
1990s fantasy adventure films
1990s science fiction films
American children's animated adventure films
American children's animated science fantasy films
American fantasy adventure films
American independent films
American robot films
American rock music films
Animated films based on animated series
Animated films about horses
Animated films about robots
Films about shapeshifting
Clay animation films
1990s stop-motion animated films
Films about cloning
1995 independent films
1990s English-language films
1990s American films